Highland Middle School can refer to several schools in North America:
 Highland Middle School (Libertyville, Illinois)
 Highland Middle School (Louisville, Kentucky)
 Highland Middle School (Toronto), Ontario, formerly named Highland Junior High School
 Highland Oaks Middle School, Miami-Dade County, Florida